The Online Film Critics Society Award for Best Supporting Actor is an annual film award given by the Online Film Critics Society to honor the best supporting actor of the year.

Winners

1990s

2000s

2010s

2020s

References

Film awards for supporting actor